Tyren Milton Johnson (born July 24, 1988) is an American professional basketball player for ADA Blois Basket 41 of the LNB Pro A. A native of Edgard, Louisiana, Johnson played college basketball at Louisiana where he was named the Sun Belt Conference Player of the Year as a senior in 2009–10. Since 2010 he has competed professionally and was named an NBA Development League All-Star in 2011–12.

College career
After graduating from West St. John High School in Edgard, Johnson began his collegiate career for Louisiana–Lafayette in 2006. His freshman season was inauspicious; he averaged 1.6 points and 1.7 rebounds per game in 25 games played. He scored a total of 41 points on the year. The following season, 2007–08, was similar to his freshman campaign. Johnson averaged 3.1 points and 3.5 rebounds per game while only scoring 90 points on the year.

In Johnson's junior season, his productivity markedly increased to 7.2 points, 5.1 rebounds, 1.5 assists, 1.3 blocks, and 0.8 steals per game. Despite his increase in personal success, the Ragin' Cajuns only mustered a 10–20 overall record for the year. For the third time in as many seasons, they failed to earn a postseason tournament bid.

The 2009–10 season saw Johnson become an All-Sun Belt Conference performer. His season statistical averages shot up to 17.9 points, 8.0 rebounds, 3.3 assists, 1.8 steals, and 1.5 blocks per game. He led Louisiana–Lafayette in all five categories and was the only Sun Belt player to lead their team in all. The league's coaches voted him as a first team All-Sun Belt selection as well. Johnson became Louisiana–Lafayette's fourth conference player of the year since the school joined NCAA Division I, and the first since Michael Allen in 1993–94. The 2009–10 season saw the Ragin' Cajuns go 9–0 in league play at home; they finished the year with an overall record of 13–17.

Professional career
Johnson was not selected in the 2010 NBA draft. He began his professional basketball career in Belgium for Okapi Aalstar. He returned to the United States in 2011–12 and signed with the NBA Development League's Rio Grande Valley Vipers. In 44 games played, he averaged 11.7 points, 5.6 rebounds, and 2.4 assists per game. He was called up as a replacement player for the 2012 NBA Development League All-Star Game after Lance Thomas was unable to participate.

The 2012–13 and 2013–14 seasons saw Johnson playing in France for Châlons Reims and Hyères-Toulon Var, respectively. While at Hyères-Toulon Var, Johnson averaged 15.8 points and 6.1 rebounds per game. In September 2014, he signed with Okapi Aalstar for his second stint with the Belgian club.

On July 30, 2015, he signed with Uşak Sportif of the Turkish Basketball League. Johnson left the team in August 2015 after he failed a team physical.

On September 26, 2016, he signed with Lavrio of Greek Basket League. He was officially released on November 19, 2016, in order to attend to family matters back in his homeland.

In the 2017–18 season, Johnson played with ADA Blois Basket 41 of the French second-tier LNB Pro B. He led his team to the championship, which therefore meant promotion to the first-tier LNB Pro A. As well, he was named the league's Most Valuable Player. Johnson spent the 2019-20 season with ADA Blois and averaged 18.4 points, 5.8 rebounds and three assists per game. On June 8, 2020, Johnson signed with Dorados de Chihuahua of the LNBP. Later in 2020, he returned to ADA Blois.

References

External links
 College statistics @ sports-reference.com
 NBA D-League statistics @ basketball-reference.com

1988 births
Living people
ADA Blois Basket 41 players
American expatriate basketball people in Belgium
American expatriate basketball people in France
American expatriate basketball people in Greece
American men's basketball players
Basketball players from Louisiana
HTV Basket players
Kyoto Hannaryz players
Lavrio B.C. players
Louisiana Ragin' Cajuns men's basketball players
Okapi Aalstar players
People from Edgard, Louisiana
Power forwards (basketball)
Reims Champagne Basket players
Rio Grande Valley Vipers players